Sir Hugh Courtenay ( 1427 – 6 May 1471) of Boconnoc in Cornwall, was twice a Member of Parliament for Cornwall in 1446–47 and 1449–50. He was beheaded after the Battle of Tewkesbury in 1471, together with John Courtenay, 7th Earl of Devon (d. 1471), the grandson of his first cousin the 4th Earl, and last in the senior line, whose titles were forfeited. His son Edward Courtenay, 1st Earl of Devon (d. 1509), was created Earl of Devon in 1485 by King Henry VII, following the Battle of Bosworth and the closure of the Wars of the Roses.

Origins

He was the second son of Sir Hugh Courtenay (c. 1358 – 1425), of Haccombe and Bampton, Devon, MP and Sheriff of Devon (a grandson of Hugh de Courtenay, 2nd/10th Earl of Devon (1303–1377) and the younger brother of Edward de Courtenay, 3rd/11th Earl of Devon (1357–1419), "The Blind Earl"), by his fourth wife Maud Beaumont (d. 3 July 1467), daughter of Sir William Beaumont of Shirwell, in Devon, by Isabel Willington, daughter of Sir Henry Willington of Umberleigh, in Devon.

Battle of Tewkesbury

Courtenay's presence at the Battle of Tewkesbury, fighting for the Lancastrian cause, is narrated by Cleaveland (1735) as follows:

Marriage and children

He married Margaret Carminow, a daughter and co-heiress of Thomas Carminow of Boconnoc, by his wife Joan Hill, a daughter of Robert Hill.
They had the following issue:

Sons
Edward Courtenay, 1st Earl of Devon (d. 1509), created Earl of Devon in 1485 by King Henry VII, the title long held by his ancestors and cousins but forfeited during the Wars of the Roses. His great-grandson was Edward Courtenay, 1st Earl of Devon (d. 1556), who died unmarried and without children, the last of the mediaeval Courtenay Earls of Devon seated at Tiverton Castle, whose co-heirs were the descendants of Sir Hugh Courtenay's four daughters below.
Sir Walter Courtenay, died childless
John Courtenay (d. 1509), died childless

Daughters
Elizabeth/Isabel Courtenay, wife of John Trethurffe of Trethurffe in the parish of Ladock, near Truro, Cornwall.
Maud Courtenay, wife of John Arundell of Talvern
Isabel/Elizabeth Courtenay, wife of William Mohun of Hall in the parish of Lanteglos-by-Fowey in Cornwall, a descendant of John Mohun (d. 1322) of Dunster Castle in Somerset, feudal baron of Dunster by his wife Anne Tiptoft. In 1628 her descendant John Mohun (1595–1641) was created by King Charles I Baron Mohun of Okehampton, his ancestor having inherited as his share Okehampton Castle and remnants of the feudal barony of Okehampton, one of the earliest possessions of the Courtenays. The Mohuns held the manor of Boconnoc not (as might be expected) as a share of the Courtenay inheritance, but by lease from the Russell Earl of Bedford.
Florence Courtenay, wife of John Trelawny

Death, burial and monument
Having died on 6 May 1471 during the Battle of Tewkesbury, he is said by Cleveland to have been buried in Tewkesbury Priory. He and his wife are said by Rogers (1877) and by Hoskins (1954), to be represented by the surviving effigies in the canopied tomb in the south aisle of Ashwater Church in Devon, which displays the arms of Courtenay and Carminowe, although the manor of Ashwater descended from Carminowe to the Carew family, not to Courtenay. Pevsner (2004) on the other hand suggests that the effigy is that of Thomas Carminow (d. 1442), and states the monument to be "the most ambitious late mediaeval monument in north-west Devon", with the design of the canopy based on those of Bishop Stafford and Bishop Branscombe in Exeter Cathedral.

Concerning the heraldry in Ashwater Church, Rogers states:

Eventual co-heirs
Thus the Courtenay estates were divided into four parts. On the death of Edward Courtenay, Earl of Devon, in 1556, the actual heirs to his estates were the following descendants of the four sisters above:
Reginald Mohun (1507/8–67) of Hall in the parish of Lanteglos-by-Fowey in Cornwall, who inherited Okehampton Castle;
Margaret Buller; 
John Vivian;  
John Trelawny.

Sources
Vivian, Lt.Col. J.L., (Ed.) The Visitations of the County of Devon: Comprising the Heralds' Visitations of 1531, 1564 & 1620, Exeter, 1895, pedigree of Courtenay, p. 245
 The National Archives: C 2/Eliz/W13/36, Winslade versus Arundell.

References

1420s births
1471 deaths
English MPs 1447
People of the Wars of the Roses
People executed under the Yorkists
Members of the pre-1707 English Parliament for constituencies in Cornwall
English MPs November 1449